Leonid Viktorovich Varpakhovsky (Russian: Леонид Викторович Варпаховский; 29 March 1908 in Moscow – 12 February 1976 in Moscow) was a  director, scenarist. A theatre in Montreal (Canada) that bears his name has been opened in  1995. People's Artist of the RSFSR (1966).

References

External links
 Из воспоминаний колымской травиаты

Soviet theatre directors
Theatre directors from Georgia (country)

1908 births
1976 deaths
People's Artists of the RSFSR
Gulag detainees
Burials at Vagankovo Cemetery
Bamlag detainees